is a Japanese table tennis player.

She won a medal at the 2019 World Table Tennis Championships.

Achievements

ITTF Tours
Women's singles

Women's doubles

Career records
Doubles
World Championships: 3rd (2019).
World Tour winner (3): Australian Open (2016), Belarus Open (2016), Austria Open (2016).
Asian Championships: 3rd (2017).

References

External links

Japanese female table tennis players
1998 births
Living people
World Table Tennis Championships medalists